Emilija Erčić (born 14 June 1962 in Belgrade) is a former Yugoslav handball player who competed in the 1984 Summer Olympics.

She was a member of the Yugoslav handball team which won the gold medal. She played three matches and scored two goals.

External links
profile

1962 births
Living people
Handball players from Belgrade
Yugoslav female handball players
Serbian female handball players
Handball players at the 1984 Summer Olympics
Olympic handball players of Yugoslavia
Olympic gold medalists for Yugoslavia
Olympic medalists in handball
Medalists at the 1984 Summer Olympics